The 2022 Spikers' Turf Open Conference was the fifteenth conference of the Spikers' Turf. The tournament were held at Paco Arena, Manila from 30 August to 6 October 2022 with a total of seven teams.

The Spikers' Turf returned after a three-year absence, with its last tournament played being the 2019 Open Conference.

NU-Sta. Elena Nationals defeated the reigning champions Cignal HD Spikers in the championship match best-of-three series to clinched their first ever gold of the tournament. Cignal HD Spikers gets their fourth silver. PGJC-Navy Sea Lions defeated VNS-One Alicia Griffins in the third place match best-of-three series and claimed their first bronze.

Participating teams

Format 
Preliminary round
 Single-round robin format.
 Top 4 teams advance to semifinals.

Semifinals
 Single-round robin format.
 The 3rd and 4th ranked teams advance to the bronze medal match.
 The 1st and 2nd ranked teams advance to the gold medal match.

Finals (best-of-three series)
 Bronze medal: SF Ranked 3 vs SF Ranked 4
 Gold medal: SF Ranked 1 vs SF Ranked 2

Venue

Squads 
The following are the club team members.

Pool standing procedure 
 Number of matches won
 Match points
 Sets ratio
 Points ratio
 If the tie continues as per the point ratio between two teams, the priority will be given to the team which won the last match between them. When the tie in points ratio is between three or more teams, a new classification of these teams in the terms of points 1, 2 and 3 will be made taking into consideration only the matches in which they were opposed to each other.

Match won 3–0 or 3–1: 3 match points for the winner, 0 match points for the loser
Match won 3–2: 2 match points for the winner, 1 match point for the loser.

Preliminary round 
All times are Philippine Standard Time (UTC+8:00).

Ranking 

|}

Match results 
|}

Final round 
All times are Philippine Standard Time (UTC+8:00).

Semifinals

Ranking 

|}

Match results 
|}

Finals 
 All are best-of-three series.

3rd place 
 PGJC-Navy wins series, 2–0.
|}

Championship 
 NU-Sta. Elena wins series, 2–0.
|}

Awards

Final standings

Statistics leaders 
Statistics leaders correct at the end of the preliminary round.

Best scorers

Best spikers

Best blockers

Best servers

Best diggers

Best setters

Best receivers

See also 
 2022 Premier Volleyball League Open Conference

References 

2022 in Philippine sport
2022 in volleyball
S
SPT
SPT
SPT